The 2009–10 Israel State Cup (Gvia HaMedina) was the 71st season of Israel's nationwide football cup competition and the 56th after the Israeli Declaration of Independence. It started on 4 September 2009, while the final was held in Ramat Gan Stadium on 11 May 2010.

The competition was won by Hapoel Tel Aviv, who had beaten Bnei Yehuda 3–1 in the final.

As Hapoel Tel Aviv won the double, Bnei Yehuda qualified to the 2010–11 UEFA Europa League, entering in the first qualifying round.

Calendar

Results

First round
Games were played from September 4 to 8 and on September 29, 2009.

Clubs participating in the Liga Bet and Liga Gimel gain entry in this round.

Second round
Games were played from September 11 to 15, 2009.

Third round
Games were played from October 6 to 10, 2009.

Fourth round
Games were played on October 27, 2009.

Fifth round
Games were played from September 25 to 26, 2009.

Clubs participating in the Liga Alef gain entry in this round.

Sixth round
Games were played from November 23 to 30, 2009.

Seventh round
Games were played on January 5 and 8, 2010.

Clubs participating in the Liga Leumit gain entry in this round.

Eighth round
Games were played from February 8 to 10, 2010.

Clubs participating in the Israeli Premier League gain entry in this round.

Round of 16 to the Final
Games were played from March 23 to May 11, 2010.

Final

External links
 Israel Football Association website 

 

Israel State Cup
State Cup
Israel State Cup seasons